Poplar Township  may refer to:

Poplar Township, Cass County, Minnesota
Poplar Township, Mitchell County, North Carolina, in Mitchell County, North Carolina

Township name disambiguation pages